TELES AG Informationstechnologien is a provider of equipment and services to fixed, fixed-mobile convergence, and Next Generation Networking (NGN) service providers.

The company was founded in 1983 as TELES GmbH by Professor Dr.-Ing. Sigram Schindler in close cooperation with the Technical University of Berlin. Professor Schindler lectured in telecommunications at the university until 1998. In 1997, he was voted High-Tech Manager of the Year by Manager Magazine in Germany.

Active in VoIP technology development since 1996, the company's main development and operational focus lies in the areas of IMS and NGN.

TELES supplies service providers with complete Class 4 and Class 5 NGN Softswitch. TELES NGN is a standard based, scalable architecture aimed at minimizing integration time and allowing quick deployment. It includes hosted voice functionality which enables residential VoIP services, hosted PBX (IP Centrex) services, Fixed-Mobile-Convergence, IP Trunking, and additional value added applications. Classical NGN/PSTN applications like Wholesale, Long Distance, and NGN backbone services are also available with this.

The TELES product portfolio also includes VoIP gateways and mobile gateways for GSM, CDMA, and UMTS networks.

History 

 1990 ISDN product development
 1992 ISDN PBX development
 1993 Least-Cost-Router development
 1996 First major VoIP patent - IntraSTAR dynamic PSTN fallback
 1998 TELES is floated on the stock market and becomes an AG (public limited company)
 1998 Introduction of clustered switching system for PSTN
 2000 First public network integrating VoIP using H.323 protocol
 2001 First highly integrated GSM and CDMA mobile gateway developed
 2002 First integrated mobile VoIP gateway developed
 2003 First centralized SIM server for mobile gateways developed
 2004 STRATO AG, a webhosting TELES subsidiary, is sold to Freenet

References 

Telecommunications companies of Germany
ICT service providers